The 2010 1000 km of Algarve was the third round of the 2010 Le Mans Series season. It took place at the Autódromo Internacional do Algarve on 17 July 2010.

Qualifying
Qualifying saw Orecatake pole position in the LMP1 class. Strakka Racing once again took pole in the LMP2 class. Applewood Seven took the FLM pole. Atlas FX Team Full Speed took the GT1 pole being one of only two cars competing in the class. The No. 96 AF Corse took the GT2 pole.

Qualifying result
Pole position winners in each class are marked in bold.

Race

Race result
Class winners in bold.  Cars failing to complete 70% of winner's distance marked as Not Classified (NC).

References

Algarve
One Thousand of Algarve